The Pembina River is a tributary of the Red River of the North, approximately  long, in southern Manitoba in Canada and northeastern North Dakota in the United States. It drains an area (about 8500 square kilometers) of the prairie country along the Canada–US border, threading the Manitoba-North Dakota border eastward to the Red River.  Via the Red River, Lake Winnipeg and the Nelson River, it is part of the watershed of Hudson Bay.

It rises in several streams on the eastern side of the Turtle Mountains on both sides of the international border. The streams converge near Neelin, Manitoba and flow initially northeast, then southeast along the west side of the Pembina Hills into Cavalier County in northeastern North Dakota. It flows east, just south of the border, past Walhalla and Neche.

The main tributaries of the Pembina River are Badger Creek and Long River. Some of the numerous minor tributaries include the Mary Jane, Pilot, Crystal, and Snowflake Creeks. There are numerous wetlands and prairie potholes in this watershed.

Water flow rates in the Pembina River watershed are highly variable. Data from hydrometric stations are used to monitor river flow rates and lake levels, for flood forecasting, and water management investigations. Water levels typically peak during spring run-off and rapidly declines generally in a few days. Groundwater contribution to stream flow normally ensures the river runs throughout the year. The months of March, April and May account for 68 percent of the run-off in a given year. Annual spring run-off rates are highly variable. In Neche, ND the lowest annual volume recorded was 356-m (2870 acre-ft) in 1939. The highest recorded volume was 94,400 hectare-m (765,000 acre-ft) in 1997.

Environment Canada has a water quality monitoring station is maintained at the south-east corner of the watershed, near the International Boundary. Information from this station is collected regularly and is used to analyze for numerous variables including pesticides, metals, nutrients, general chemistry, and bacteria. A study conducted in 2001  found that over a 25-year period (1974–99) phosphorus concentrations had increased by 52 percent in the Pembina river. This increase in phosphorus is likely a result of increased nutrient input from a combination of wastewater treatment, agricultural inputs, and atmospheric depositions. Elevated phosphorus concentrations promote excessive algal bloom growth, which have many undesirable outcomes for the watershed and the entire Lake Winnipeg basin.

See also
List of Manitoba rivers
List of North Dakota rivers
Pembina Valley Provincial Park
Pembina Gorge State Recreation Area

References

Rivers of Manitoba
Rivers of North Dakota
International rivers of North America
Bodies of water of Cavalier County, North Dakota
Bodies of water of Pembina County, North Dakota
Tributaries of the Red River of the North